Robert or Bob Barrett may refer to:

 Bob Barrett (American football) (born 1935), American football player
 Bob Barrett (baseball) (1899–1982), American baseball infielder
 Bob Barrett (politician) (born 1967), Minnesota state representative
 Rob Barrett (born 1969), American guitarist for Cannibal Corpse
 Bob Barrett (actor) (born 1966), English stage and television actor
 Robert Barrett (athlete) (born 1957), British Paralympian
 Robert E. Barrett, former water company president and namesake of the Robert E. Barrett Fishway on the Connecticut River, United States 
 Robert G. Barrett (1942–2012), Australian author
 Robert T. Barrett (born 1949), American illustrator
 Robert Barrett (director), co-director of Beyond the Door

See also 
 Robert Barrat (1889–1970), American actor